Henry Scardeville (1654–1703) was an Anglican priest in Ireland in the second half of the 17th century and the very start of the eighteenth.

Scardeville was born in Salisbury and educated at Trinity College, Dublin. He was Archdeacon of Ross and Dean of Cloyne until his death.

Notes

Alumni of Trinity College Dublin
Deans of Cloyne
18th-century Irish Anglican priests
17th-century Irish Anglican priests
1654 births
1703 deaths
Archdeacons of Ross, Ireland